Emil Joseph Husak (September 18, 1930 – July 30, 1997) was an American politician in the state of Iowa.

Husak was born in Toledo, Iowa. He was a farmer and former school bus driver. Husak served as a Democrat in the Iowa House from 1971 to 1981, and in the State Senate from 1981 to 1997.

References

1930 births
1997 deaths
Republican Party Iowa state senators
Republican Party members of the Iowa House of Representatives
Farmers from Iowa
People from Toledo, Iowa
20th-century American politicians